Edward J. Kay (November 27, 1898 – December 22, 1973) was an American film composer and musical director, who worked on over 340 films from the 1930s into the 1960s, and was nominated on multiple occasions for an Academy Award for Best Original Score, although he never won. On his last film, 1962's The Creation of the Humanoids, he was also a producer.

In 1941, Kay was nominated for King of the Zombies, but lost to Bernard Herrmann for All That Money Can Buy. The following year, Kay was nominated for Klondike Fury, losing to Max Steiner, for Now, Voyager. Kay was nominated in 1943 for Lady, Let's Dance, losing to Morris Stoloff and Carmen Dragon for Cover Girl. Finally, in 1945, Kay was nominated for his work on two films, G. I. Honeymoon in the comedy/drama category, and Sunbonnet Sue in the musical category; Kay lost in both categories, to Miklós Rózsa, for Spellbound, and to Georgie Stoll for Anchors Aweigh, respectively. Kay was the only composer to substitute for Lee Zahler on a Columbia Pictures production between 1938 and 1947, when Kay composed for Brenda Starr Reporter in 1945. Kay was a frequent collaborator with director William Beaudine.

Kay was born in New York City, and died in Los Angeles County, California.

Selected filmography

Films for which Edward J. Kay composed or directed music include:

References

External links

1898 births
1973 deaths
American film score composers
20th-century American composers